Namioka (written: 波岡) is a Japanese surname. Notable people with the surname include:

Isaac Namioka (1928–2019), Japanese-American mathematician
Lensey Namioka (born 1929), Chinese-born American writer
, Japanese actor

Japanese-language surnames